The 2013 Sun Belt Conference men's basketball tournament was held in Hot Springs, Arkansas from March 8 to March 11 at the Summit Arena and the Convention Center Court.  The Tournament winner received an automatic bid into the 2013 NCAA tournament. The Semifinals games was televised on the Sun Belt Network, with the championship game on ESPN, on Monday March 11.

Bracket

References

External links

Sun Belt Conference men's basketball tournament
Tournament
Sun Belt Conference men's basketball tournament
Sun Belt Conference men's basketball tournament